Wangan is a town and a locality in the Cassowary Coast Region, Queensland, Australia.

Wangan has a medium sized residential area, as well has a local metal industry. Surrounding these areas is large farms of sugarcane and bananas.

History 
Mundoo Provisional School opened on 5 August 1895. It became Mundoo State School on 1 January 1909.

Education 
Mundoo State School is a government primary (Prep-6) school for boys and girls at 100 Cardier Road. In 2017, the school had an enrolment of 25 students with 3 teachers (2 full-time equivalent) and 5 non-teaching staff (3 full-time equivalent). In 2018, the school had an enrolment of 27 students with 4 teachers (3 full-time equivalent) and 5 non-teaching staff (3 full-time equivalent).

Community groups 
The East Palmerston branch of the Queensland Country Women's Association meets at the Currajah Hotel, Grima Street, Wangan.

References

External links 
 
 Town map of Wangan, 1979

Towns in Queensland
Cassowary Coast Region
Localities in Queensland